By the Light of the Moon is the third album by the Mexican American rock group Los Lobos.

Track listing

Charts

Credits
Writing, performance and production credits are adapted from the album liner notes.

Personnel
Los Lobos
 David Hidalgo – lead vocals, guitars, accordion, six-string bass, lap steel, violin, hidalguera, percussion
 Cesar Rosas – lead vocals, guitars, bajo sexto, mandolin, vihuela
 Conrad Lozano – Fender electric bass, acoustic bass, guitarrón, vocals
 Louie Pérez – drums, guitars, tenor longneck plectrum, hidalguera
 Steve Berlin – tenor and baritone saxophones, harmonica

Session members
 Alex Acuña – percussion
 T-Bone Burnett – vocals
 Mickey Curry – drums
 Anton Fier – drums
 Mitchell Froom – keyboards
 Ron Tutt – drums

Production
 T-Bone Burnett, Los Lobos – production
 Bernie Grundman – mastering
 Larry Hirsch – recording, mixing
 David Glover, Mike Kloster, Stephen Shelton, Jimmy Preziosi, Doug Schwartz, Tony Chiappa, Magic Moreno – assistant recording
 Mark Linett – remixing ("Is This All There Is?")

Artwork and design
 Jeff Price, Jeri McManus – art direction
 Lendon Flanagan – photography

References

Los Lobos albums
1987 albums
Albums produced by T Bone Burnett
Slash Records albums